From 1 November 2016, Manipur, a state in Northeast India faced economic blockade by United Naga Council. This blockade finally ended on 19 March 2017 midnight after discussion between government and UNC. The decision to lift the blockade was taken after the UNC, the state government and the Centre arrived at a consensus. The blockade ended after 139 days.

Background
Imphal, the state capital of Manipur, is situated in a valley which has 90% of the population of the state. Meiteis are the majority in the valley. The hills which have 90% of the land of the state are mostly under the Nagas, Kukis and the other hill people. The valley is reached by National Highways 2 and 37. There is another 100-km road from Moreh on the border of Myanmar. These roads pass through Naga inhabited hills. Manipur has a long history of armed insurgency and violence. Naga tribes have demand of Nagalim or a greater Nagaland which incorporates Naga-majority hill districts of Manipur as well as parts of Arunachal Pradesh, Assam and Myanmar into the present-day state of Nagaland. In 2011, there was an economic blockade that continued for more than 100 days.

Unrest
Tamenglong, Senapati, Ukhrul and Chandel are Naga-majority hill districts. The UNC opposed the creation of seven new districts in the state. United Naga Council (UNC) declared an economic blockade on 1 November 2016 in response. They alleged that the new districts encroach on the ancestral land of the Nagas and it is done to weaken their vote in the upcoming state assembly elections.

They blocked National Highway 2 and 37 and stopped all trucks carrying supply to Imphal. The Trans-Asian Highway was also blocked. The blockade was continued as the 'total shutdown' when UNC president Gaidon Kamei and information secretary Stephen Lamkang were arrested on 25 November.

The blockade was still ongoing as of 26 December 2016. It resulted in inflation in prices and shortages of food, fuel, medicines, gas and other essential supplies. Mobile internet has been suspended. The police presence is increased and 4000 personnel of central paramilitary forces are sent by the Government of India. The town remains under curfew.

There were incidents of assaults on members of Naga people and Meitei people in their minority areas. The policemen were assaulted at some places; three were killed and 14 were injured. Some government offices were burnt down.

Reaction
A delegation of UNC leaders met Union Home Minister Rajnath Singh and asked to impose President's Rule in the state. The chief minister of Manipur, Okram Ibobi Singh, who leads Indian National Congress government in Manipur, requested to withdraw the blockade and discuss the demands. As UNC did not agree, he requested central government to hold tripartite talk s. On 15 November, the Manipur government backed out of talks held by the central government with UNC. The central government ruling Bharatiya Janata Party had requested UNC to withdraw the blockade.

References

2010s in Manipur
2016 in India
2016 protests
Northeast India